Sangchin-e Saleh (also Romanized as Sangchīn-e Şāleḩ and Sang Chīn Şāleḩ) is a village in Cheleh Rural District, in the Central District of Gilan-e Gharb County, Kermanshah Province, Iran. At the 2006 census, its population was 222, in 49 families.

References 

Populated places in Gilan-e Gharb County